Thyrotropin-releasing hormone receptor (TRHR) is a G protein-coupled receptor which binds thyrotropin-releasing hormone.

The TRHR is found on the cell membrane of thyrotropes of the anterior pituitary. When the TRHR is activated it associates with a Gαq/11 protein. The TRHR-G protein complex then activates phospholipase C, which causes the formation of inositol triphosphate (IP3) and diacylglycerol (DAG). This leads to an increase in cytoplasmic calcium ion concentrations which stimulates the exocytosis of thyroid-stimulating hormone (TSH) into the blood.

References

Further reading

External links 
 
 

G protein-coupled receptors